Skookumchuck Rapids Provincial Park is a provincial park in British Columbia, Canada, located on the Shuswap River just below the outlet of Mabel Lake.
This park was established as a result of the Okanagan-Shuswap Land and Resource Management Plan.

References 

Monashee Mountains
Provincial parks of British Columbia
Provincial parks in the Okanagan
Protected areas established in 2004
2004 establishments in British Columbia